The 1984 Sugar Bowl was the 50th edition of the college football bowl game, played at the Louisiana Superdome in New Orleans, Louisiana, on Monday, January 2. Part of the 1983–84 bowl game season, it matched the third-ranked Auburn Tigers of the Southeastern Conference (SEC), and the #8 Michigan Wolverines of the Big Ten Conference. Favored Auburn was shut out until the third quarter, but rallied with three field goals to 

New Year's Day was on Sunday in 1984, and the college bowl games were played the following day.

Teams

Auburn

Michigan

Game summary
The game kicked off shortly after 7 p.m. CST, televised by ABC, at the same time as the Orange Bowl on NBC.

The only scoring in the first half was on a four-yard touchdown run by Michigan quarterback Steve Smith. It was set up by a 19-yard completion from Smith to Triando Makray, and 38 yards rushing by Rick Rogers. The Wolverines finished the first quarter with a 116–61 differential in yardage and took that 7–0 lead into halftime.

Auburn used a tremendous Wishbone rushing attack throughout the game and attempted only six passes. They finished with 301 rushing yards on 21 first downs, with 130 yards by Bo Jackson, the game's MVP. Midway through the third quarter, Auburn kicker Al Del Greco made a 31-yard field goal to get the Tigers on the scoreboard and the quarter ended with Michigan leading 7–3. In the fourth quarter, Del Greco added two more field goals, of 32 and 19 yards, the latter in the last half-minute, to seal a 9–7 victory for Auburn.

Scoring
First quarter
Michigan – Steve Smith 4-yard run (Bob Bergeron kick)
Second quarter
No scoring
Third quarter
Auburn – Al Del Greco 31-yard field goal
Fourth quarter
Auburn – Del Greco 32-yard field goal
Auburn – Del Greco 19-yard field goal

Statistics
{| class=wikitable style="text-align:center"
! Statistics !!   Auburn   !!  Michigan 
|-
|align=left|First Downs || 21|| 12
|-
|align=left|Rushes–yards|| 67–301|| 31–118
|-
|align=left|Passing yards || 21 || 125
|-
|align=left|Passing (C–A–I) || 2–6–1 || 9–25–1
|-
|align=left|Total Offense || 73–332|| 56–243
|-
|align=left|Return yards ||8 || 13
|-
|align=left|Punts–average ||4–42.0|| 8–38.3
|-
|align=left|Fumbles–lost ||4–3|| 2–1
|-
|align=left|Turnovers||4||2
|-
|align=left|Penalties–yards ||3–15||6–49
|-
|align=left|Time of possession ||37:32||22:28
|}

Aftermath
Despite Auburn's victory and a loss in the Cotton Bowl by No. 2 Texas, who Auburn had lost to by 13 points at home on September 17th, the Tigers were not voted national champions in either of the final wire service polls. The #5 Miami Hurricanes vaulted past Auburn to the top spot with their 31–30 victory over top-ranked Nebraska in the Orange Bowl; Auburn remained at third in both final polls.

References

External links
 Summary at Bentley Historical Library, University of Michigan Athletics History

Sugar Bowl
Sugar Bowl
Auburn Tigers football bowl games
Michigan Wolverines football bowl games
Sugar Bowl
Sugar Bowl